Rosalinda is a Mexican telenovela produced by Salvador Mejía Alejandre for Televisa in 1999. It is a remake the telenovela María Teresa on 1972. Thalía, Fernando Carrillo and Angélica María star as the main protagonists, while Lupita Ferrer stars as the main antagonist.

This was the last telenovela wherein Thalía starred in (to focus on her rising music career at that time). Rosalinda remains as the most expensive television production in Mexico, as well as the all-time most exported and most watched single telenovela in the world, as it was broadcast in Mexico and more than 180 countries worldwide to 2 billion viewers by 2000.

Plot
Rosalinda is a pretty woman who sells flowers and decorates a fancy restaurant. One day, she meets Fernando José, a man of high social status. He plays the piano at the restaurant. They eventually fall in love, get married, and have a child named Erika, but his stepmother Valeria desires to split the happy couple up, and she has the perfect way of doing so.

Rosalinda's real mother, Soledad, served a 20-year prison sentence for the murder of Fernando José's real father. She was innocent, but took the blame. After finding out this horrible news, Fernando José abandons Rosalinda and her daughter. Valeria kidnaps Erika. Rosalinda goes into a clinical and eventually loses her mind. She is locked up in a mental hospital.

One night, the mental hospital catches fire and burns down. Rosalinda manages to escape, but her loved ones are convinced she is dead. Suffering from a major case of amnesia, she is forced to become a thief by an old man who takes her in. She meets Alejandro "Alex" Dorantes while trying to steal from his house. Alex cleans her up and she takes on the identity of Paloma Dorantes and becomes a singer. She falls in love with Alex, the talent agent who makes her famous. Meanwhile, Fernando José marries Rosalinda's cousin, Fedra.

Rosalinda's life with Alex seems to be going well. However, things just don't seem to be totally right. One night, Rosalinda and Alex attend one of Fernando Jose's concerts. He plays a song which happens to be the first one he played the day they met. This seems to trigger Rosalinda's memory of her past. Overwhelmed by these memories, Rosalinda scurries out of the concert hall and gets hit by a car. Alex rushes her to the hospital. It is then that Rosalinda realizes that she is not Paloma, but Rosalinda. Now that Rosalinda has gained her memory back, she must go back and fight to gain her child back, her family, and Fernando Jose in the process.

Cast

Main cast
Thalía as Rosalinda Pérez Romero/Rosalinda del Castillo de Altamirano / Paloma Dοrantes
Fernando Carrillo as Fernando José Altamirano del Castillo
Angélica María as Soledad Martha Romero
Lupita Ferrer as Doña Valeria Del Castillo

Recurring cast
Nora Salinas as Fedra Pérez Romero
Adriana Fonseca as Lucía Pérez Romero
Elvira Monsell as Bertha Álvarez
Jorge De Silva as Roberto "Beto" Pérez Romero
René Muñoz as Florentino Rosas 
Eduardo Luna as Aníbal Eduardo Rivera Pacheco
Víctor Noriega as Alejandro "Alex" Dorantes
Miguel Ángel Rodríguez as Javier Pérez
Anastasia as Alcira Ordóñez
Ninón Sevilla as Asunción
Renata Flores as Zoila Barriga
Alejandro Ávila as Gerardo Navarette
Laura Zapata as Verónica Del Castillo de Altamirano
Ivonne Montero as Celina Barriga
Guillermo García Cantú as José Fernando Altamirano
Susana González as Luz Elena
Sabine Moussier as Cristina

Special Participation
Queta Lavat as the prison director

Awards and nominations

Philippine adaptation

In 2009, GMA Network produce a Philippine adaptation of the series starring Carla Abellana as Rosalinda and Geoff Eigenmann as Fernando Jose. Rosalinda premiered on July 6, 2009 on the network's Telebabad primetime block and ended on November 27, 2009 with a total of 105 episodes.

References

External links

1999 telenovelas
1999 Mexican television series debuts
1999 Mexican television series endings
Mexican telenovelas
Televisa telenovelas
Mexican television series based on Venezuelan television series
Spanish-language telenovelas
Television shows set in Mexico City